Powell High School can refer to:

Powell High School (Tennessee) in Powell, Tennessee
Powell High School (Wyoming) in Powell, Wyoming

See also

 
 
 Powell Middle School (disambiguation)
 Powell (disambiguation)